Carlisle School District may refer to:
 Carlisle Area School District - Pennsylvania
 Carlisle Community Schools (also known as the Carlisle School District) - Iowa
 Carlisle Independent School District - Texas
 Carlisle School District - Arkansas